Phrynopus oblivius is a species of frog in the family Strabomantidae. It is endemic to central Peru and only known from near its type locality near Maraynioc, in the Tarma Province, Junín Region, at about  asl. It is known from a collection in 2005; there has been no later surveys for the species.

Description
Adult males measure  and adult females  in snout–vent length. The snout is short and rounded. The tympanum is absent. The finger and toe tips are rounded; toes have lateral fringes. Skin on dorsum is smooth and has few, small tubercles and forms discoidal folds. The dorsum is dark brown and has small, white spots The venter is reddish brown and has small, white spots. The iris is gold and has golden reticulations. Males have neither vocal sacs nor nuptial pads.

Habitat and conservation
The known specimens were found in remnants of a cloud forest, all beneath rocks next to a small creek. The species shares its habitat with Gastrotheca griswoldi. It is possible that habitat loss is occurring in the general area of type locality.

References

oblivius
Endemic fauna of Peru
Amphibians of the Andes
Amphibians of Peru
Amphibians described in 2007